Borris Little is a townland in the civil parish of Borris in the barony of Maryborough East in County Leix.

References

Townlands of County Laois